The 2014–15 Providence Friars men's basketball team represented Providence College during the 2014–15 NCAA Division I men's basketball season. The Friars, led by fourth-year head coach Ed Cooley, played their home games at the Dunkin' Donuts Center, and were members of the Big East Conference. They finished the season 22–12, 11–7 in Big East play to finish in fourth place. They advanced to the semifinals of the Big East tournament where they lost to Villanova. They received an at-large bid to the NCAA tournament where they lost in the second round to Dayton.

Previous season 
The Friars finished the season 23–12, 10–8 in Big East play to finish in a three-way tie for third place. They were champions of the Big East tournament to earn the conference's automatic bid to the NCAA tournament where they lost in the second round to North Carolina.

Departures

Incoming recruits

Class of 2015 recruits

Roster

Schedule 

|-
!colspan=9 style="background:#000000; color:#C0C0C0;"| Exhibition

|-
!colspan=9 style="background:#000000; color:#C0C0C0;"| Non-conference regular season

|-
!colspan=9 style="background:#000000; color:#C0C0C0;"| Big East Conference Play

|-
!colspan=9 style="background:#000000; color:#C0C0C0;"| Big East tournament

|-
!colspan=9 style="background:#000000; color:#C0C0C0;"| NCAA tournament

Source:

Rankings

Notes

References

Providence Friars men's basketball seasons
Providence
Providence
Providence
Providence